Country Code: +672 1x (partial)
International Call Prefix: 0011
Trunk Prefix: 

National Significant Numbers (NSN):
six digits (fixed)
six digits (mobile)

Format: +672 1X XXXX

Telephone numbers in the Australian Antarctic Territory use the same country code as Telephone numbers in Norfolk Island.

Numbering

References

Australian Antarctic Territory, The
Australian Antarctic Territory